The 2003 SBC Cotton Bowl Classic was a post-season college football bowl game between the Texas Longhorns and the LSU Tigers on January 1, 2003, at the Cotton Bowl in Dallas, Texas. It was the final game of the 2002 NCAA Division I-A football season for each team and resulted in a 35–20 Texas victory. Texas represented the Big 12 Conference while LSU represented the Southeastern Conference (SEC).

The University of Texas started out their season strong, and finished well, compiling a 10–2 record:  they lost to Oklahoma, 35–24 and the Texas Tech Red Raiders 42–38 while being ranked number 4.

Louisiana State started off their season 6–1. However, an injury to their starting quarterback Matt Mauck caused them to lose their last few games (to Alabama 0–31, Auburn 7–31, and Arkansas 20–21). They finished with an 8–4 regular season record, a disappointing year.

Scoring summary

References 

Cotton Bowl Classic
Cotton Bowl Classic
LSU Tigers football bowl games
Texas Longhorns football bowl games
January 2003 sports events in the United States
2003 in sports in Texas
2000s in Dallas
2003 in Texas